Tannock is a surname, and may refer to:

 Charles Tannock, British politician and psychiatrist
 Colin Tannock (1891–1972), Scottish-born Australian politician
 David Tannock (1873–1952), New Zealand horticulturist
 James Tannock (1784–1863), Scottish portrait painter
 Peter Tannock (born 1940), Australian rules football administrator
 Ross Tannock (born 1971), Scottish footballer